Secondhand Opinions is the second album by Canadian punk rock band Not by Choice, released on 26 October 2004. Days Go By and Call Out were released as singles, and a video was made for Days Go By.

Track listing
"Out Of Reach (Too Far Gone)"  
"Home"   
"Call Out"   
"Days Go By"   
"So Close"   
"Tongue Tied"   
"Save Yourself"   
"Never Say Goodbye"   
"Here With Me"   
"Wake Up"   
"Echoes"   
"Things Will Never Be The Same"

References

2004 albums
Not by Choice albums
MapleMusic Recordings albums